DR2 (DR To) is the second television channel operated by the Danish Broadcasting Corporation (DR) in Denmark. It covers a wide range of subject matter, but tending towards more "highbrow" programmes than the more mainstream and popular DR1. Like DR's other TV and radio channels, it is funded by a media licence, and is therefore commercial-free.

History
It was launched in 1996 as a satellite-/cable-only channel. This was highly controversial at the time, as it was considered close to a breach of public service principles that the new station did not reach all viewers. Adding to the critics' cause was the fact that DR did in fact have broadband spectrum available for terrestrial broadcasts. However, this was being reserved for digital broadcasting tests. The less-than-100%-coverage coupled with a "highbrow" reputation resulted in low ratings which in turn earned it the nickname "the secret channel" to the regret of the director general who had been pushing the line "my channel" (in the sense of programmes appealing to individuals, not the whole family as DR1 supposedly). This was finally remedied on 31 March 2006, when terrestrial digital broadcasts started.

It most resembles the British BBC Four in that its main output is experimental comedy, documentaries and in-depth news programmes. It has earned much praise for high quality shows, especially in the first category, with series like Casper & Mandrilaftalen and Drengene fra Angora. Den 11. time was a talk show on the channel. 
It also broadcasts many British productions, e.g. crime dramas such as Prime Suspect.

Every Saturday DR2 broadcasts the Greenlandic language News bulletin Nyheder fra Grønland produced by KNR.

Between 8 and 10:30 pm Wednesdays, various European thriller series are aired. And every Friday at 8 pm, a rather recently produced film is aired. At late Sunday afternoons (ending at 8 pm), a classic film is broadcast; typically from the late 1960s until the mid 1990s.

The news, called "Deadline" (in Danish) is on at 10:30 pm, and differs from DR 1's "TV-Avisen" in just giving a brief overview of today's events, the followed by (usually) two news that is treated more deep. DR2 is sometimes used as "Breaking News", but only when really called for. The channel also covers society issues and various types of society-related debates.

Following the introduction of digital television (and closing down of all analogue channels with exception of cable-TV) in Denmark, on 1 November 2009, the channel is broadcast free-to-air via a public DVB-T and MPEG-4 system. It now reaches the whole country and also the nearby east side of Øresund sea to southernmost Sweden. (Swedish channels reaches the Copenhagen metropolitan area as well)

In 2013 the channel was rebranded and converted to a 24-hour channel with the inclusion of hourly news and current affairs programming. DR Update previously aired some of the programming before the channel was closed to make room for DR Ultra. DR2, unlike DR Update will however not interrupt any programmes for breaking news.

The channel switched from SD to 720p HD broadcasting on 28 February 2017.

Logos and identities

Examples of programmes on DR2

Original programming
 Vesterbro - comedy
 Deadline - news
 So ein Ding - about new technical products
 Filmperler - quality film from all countries
 TV TV TV - television about television
 Rytteriet - Danish comedy
 Bonderøven - Later moved to DR1 following the big success of the show
 Jul på Vesterbro - Danish Christmas comedy (broadcast between 1 and 24 December, a Scandinavian TV-tradition.)

Imports 
As is the practice with most other TV channels in Denmark, foreign programmes are shown in their original language but with Danish subtitles.
 Columbo
 Waking the Dead
 Above Suspicion
 Hamish Macbeth
 Wycliffe
 Spooks
 The Body Farm
 Cato Isaksen
 Génesis, en la mente del asesino
 Engrenaves
 Flying Doctors
 The Daily Show

Travel series 

 Pilot Guides

References 

Television stations in Denmark
Television channels and stations established in 1996
1996 establishments in Denmark